Marcelo Luis Trapasso (born 30 April 1976) is an Argentine former footballer who is last known to have played as a midfielder for Châteauroux.

Career

Trapasso started his career with Argentine top flight side Argentinos Juniors, where he made 26 league appearances and scored 5 goals, and suffered relegation to the Argentine second tier. In 1997, Trapasso signed for Atlanta in the Argentine second tier. In 2000, he signed for French second-tier club Gueugnon, helping them win the 1999–00 Coupe de la Ligue, and scoring in the final, their only major trophy. 

In 2001, he signed for Sochaux in the French Ligue 1, helping them win the 2003–04 Coupe de la Ligue, their only Coupe de la Ligue win. In 2005, Trapasso signed for French second-tier team Châteauroux.

Honours
Gueugnon
 Coupe de la Ligue: 1999–2000

References

External links

 

Argentine footballers
Argentine expatriate sportspeople in France
Living people
Expatriate footballers in France
Association football midfielders
1976 births
Argentinos Juniors footballers
Ligue 1 players
Ligue 2 players
LB Châteauroux players
FC Sochaux-Montbéliard players
FC Gueugnon players
All Boys footballers
Club Atlético Atlanta footballers
Club Almagro players
Argentine expatriate footballers